Rubidgina is a genus of Biarmosuchian therapsid from Patrysfontein, Wellwood, South Africa known from RC 55, a skull with lower jaws. This specimen is a putative juvenile.  It has been suggested that this specimen actually represents a juvenile of Herpetoskylax hopsoni. However, because the specimen lacks distinctive features, it cannot be determined if it is actually a juvenile of Herpetoskylax or if its current name of Rubidgina should remain.

References

Biarmosuchians
Prehistoric therapsid genera
Lopingian synapsids of Africa
Fossil taxa described in 1942